The 2008 Novak Djokovic tennis season officially commenced on January 14 with the start of the 2008 Australian Open.

Yearly summary

Grand Slam performances

Australian Open

Novak Djokovic defeated unseeded Jo-Wilfried Tsonga in the final 4–6, 6–4, 6–3, 7–6(7–2) to win the Men's Singles tennis title at the Australian Open.
It was the first Grand Slam title of Djokovic's career. 

Djokovic became the first Serbian player to win a Grand Slam men's singles title.

French Open

Wimbledon

US Open

All matches
This table lists all the matches of Djokovic this year, including walkovers (W/O)

Singles matches

 	

 
 
 

 
 
 

 
 
 

 

 

 

 

 
 
 
 

Source

Doubles matches

Source

Yearly records

Finals

Singles: 7 (4 titles, 3 runner-up)

See also
 2008 ATP Tour
 2008 Roger Federer tennis season
 2008 Rafael Nadal tennis season

References

External links
  
 ATP tour profile

Novak Djokovic tennis seasons
Djokovic
2008 in Serbian sport
Medalists at the 2008 Summer Olympics
Tennis players at the 2008 Summer Olympics